Christa Fontana was an Italian luger who competed in the late 1970s and early 1980s. A natural track luger, she won a silver medal in the women's singles event at the 1980 FIL World Luge Natural Track Championships in Passeier, Italy.

Fontana also earned a silver medal in the women's singles event at the 1979 FIL European Luge Natural Track Championships in Aosta, Italy.

References
Natural track European Championships results 1970-2006.
Natural track World Championships results: 1979-2007

Italian female lugers
Living people
Year of birth missing (living people)